Capital of Jammu and Kashmir may refer to:
 Jammu, winter capital of Jammu and Kashmir
 Srinagar, summer capital of Jammu and Kashmir